The 2009 Vuelta a Asturias was the 53rd edition of the Vuelta a Asturias road cycling stage race, which was held from 28 April to 2 May 2009. The race started and finished in Oviedo. The race was won by Francisco Mancebo of the  team.

General classification

References

Vuelta Asturias
2009 in road cycling
2009 in Spanish sport